The gray thrasher (Toxostoma cinereum) is a medium-sized passerine bird belonging to the family Mimidae. It is endemic to the Baja California peninsula of Mexico.

Taxonomy and systematics

The gray thrasher has two subspecies, the nominate T. c. cinereum and T. c. mearnsi.

Description

It is gray-brown above with cinnamon tones on the rump. Its underparts are white with arrow-shaped black spots. The outer tail feathers have white tips. Its eyes are golden yellow. The subspecies are similar, with T. c. mearnsi being somewhat darker overall.

Distribution and habitat

The gray thrasher is found only in Mexico's Baja California, where its range extends from approximately north latitude 31°14' to its southern tip. On the east side of the peninsula, however, it is found only as far north as approximately 28°. T. c. mearnsi occupies approximately the northern half of the range and the nominate subspecies the southern half.

The gray thrasher inhabits arid and semi-arid landscapes. Most are open to semi-open with cacti, scrub, or scattered bushes and trees.

Behavior

Feeding

The gray thrasher typically forages on the ground or low down in vegetation. Its diet is not well studied but is known to include arthropods and cactus fruits.

Breeding

Subspecies T. c. mearnsi of the gray thrasher breeds in March and April; T. c. cinereum breeds from May to mid-July in the far south. The species' nest is a cup made of twigs and lined with finer materials such as grass. T. c. mearnsi almost always places its nest in cacti, while T. c. cinereum uses cacti, thorny shrubs, and mesquite trees. Nests are typically within  of the ground. The clutch size is two to four.

Vocalization

The gray thrasher's song is "a loud, fairly scratchy warbling...repeated two or three times"', and often sung from a high open perch. Its calls include  "a rolled, rippling to rough whirr-rr-rr or chirr-rri-rrit, and a gruff chrek".

Status

The IUCN has assessed the gray thrasher as being of Least Concern. It has a very large range and an apparently stable population of at least 20,000 mature individuals.

References

Further reading

 Peterson, Roger Tory & Edward L. Chalif (1973) A Field Guide to Mexican Birds, Houghton Mifflin.
 van Perlo, Ber (2006) A Field Guide to the Birds of Mexico and Central America, Collins.

gray thrasher
Birds of Mexico
gray thrasher
gray thrasher
Endemic birds of Mexico